Song Yet to Be Sung is the debut studio album by Jane's Addiction vocalist Perry Farrell, released on July 16, 2001, on Virgin Records.

Originally titled The Diamond Jubilee, it features collaborations from Farrell's bandmates Dave Navarro, Stephen Perkins and Martyn LeNoble. The title track was the official song in trailers for the series premiere of the television show Smallville.

"When I do get to rehearsing and playing it live," he said in early 2001, "there will still be highs, but they probably won't get up where Jane's goes. So if I am remembered for only one thing, then that's a shame. But if it burns brighter because Jane's is there, then I can live easy with that legacy."

Track listing
"Happy Birthday Jubilee" - 4:39
"Song Yet to Be Sung" - 4:54
"Did You Forget" - 4:10
"Shekina" - 4:53
"Our Song" - 4:21
"Say Something" - 3:45
"Seeds" - 3:48
"King Z" - 3:31
"To Me" - 2:59
"Nua Nua" - 4:37
"Admit I" - 4:23
"Happy Birthday Jubilee (reprise) - 2:40

Notes

2001 debut albums
Perry Farrell albums
Albums produced by Marius de Vries
Virgin Records albums